South Shields was a semi-professional rugby league club. The club was based in South Shields in Tyne and Wear at the mouth of the River Tyne, England.

The club played semi-professional rugby league for a total of two seasons, 1902–03 and 1903–04, joining direct from foundation. They were voted out of the league at the end of season 1903–04.

History

Early Days 

There had already been rugby league teams based on Tyneside just after the rugby schism that resulted in the formation of rugby league, Wallsend RFC, but they had not had great success.

South Shields were founded in 1902. They had not played in any league when elected to the Rugby Football League 2nd Division for the 1902–03 season.

Northern Union 

At the end of the 1901–02 season, the County Leagues elected 18 teams to join the new Division 2 (7 from Lancashire and 10 from Yorkshire and new member South Shields) with the existing second competition scrapped.

In their first season of 1902–03 South Shields finished a lowly 14th out of 18 clubs.

In their second and last season, 1903–04, they again had a poor season and finished 15th out of 17 clubs.

Although there is virtually no evidence, it is suspected that South Shields Rugby League Club had failed to attract any reasonable attendances or generate sufficient income, due probably to apathy on behalf of the population. The same apathy had resulted in the same two problems affecting the several Association football clubs who had gone both before and after them, and all of which had gone into liquidation, administration or bankruptcy. South Shields Rugby Club were voted out of the league at the end of season 1903–04.

Stadium 

South Shields played at Horsley Hill in North East South Shields, quite near the sea front.

After the demise of South Shields Rugby Club, the newly formed South Shields Adelaide AFC. took over the former rugby ground, early in 1905 for an annual rental of £30. This action almost caused the demise of Adelaide as well, as a promised loan for this purpose failed to materialise. It was left to a local solicitor, Victor Grunhut, to loan the money to the club, a simple loan of £35 on a simple IOU, payable within three months.

A third South Shield FC emerged in 1936, also playing initially at Horsley Hill, which by this time had become a greyhound stadium.

The stadium closed to Greyhound Racing in 1966, remaining as ‘The Dog’s Bowl’ bowling alley until it was demolished in the late 70's. A jet filling station had been built on the car park at the junction of Horsley Hill Road and Westcott Avenue.

After demolition, the area was redeveloped for housing.

Club League Record 
The league positions for South Shields for the 3 years in which they played semi-professional rugby league are given in the following table:-

Heading Abbreviations
RL = Single Division; Pl = Games played; W = Win; D = Draw; L = Lose; PF = Points for; PA = Points against; Diff = Points difference (+ or -); Pts = League points
% Pts = A percentage system was used to determine league positions due to clubs playing varying number of fixtures and against different opponents 
League points: for win = 2; for draw = 1; for loss = 0.

Several fixtures & results 
The following are just a few of South Shields fixtures during the two seasons in which they played (semi) professional Rugby League.

Notes and Comments 

 Folly Fields is the stadium used by Wigan at the time until 1901. They then became sub-tenants of Springfield Park See below - Note 3. 
 Lowerhouse Lane is the original site of the current ground used by Widnes. It was renamed Naughton Park in 1932 in honour of club secretary, Tom Naughton - and later renamed Halton Stadium after being completely rebuilt in 1997.
 Wigan became sub-tenants of Springfield Park, which they shared with Wigan United AFC, playing their first game there on 14 September 1901 at which a crowd of 4,000 saw them beat Morecambe 12–0, and the last game on 28 April 1902 when Wigan beat the Rest of Lancashire Senior Competition. A temporary ground was necessary to span the period between moving from Folly Fields and the new ground at Central Park being constructed.

See also 
List of defunct rugby league clubs

References

External links 
North East Rugby League Clubs
Football Grounds in focus
South Shields AFC - The early years 1889-1919
Aloha from South Shields
South Shields FC, the Football League Years, A Complete Record of a forgotten club author George Thompson - published by Yore Publications in 2000

English rugby league teams
Defunct rugby league teams in England
Rugby league teams in Tyne and Wear
Sport in South Shields
Rugby clubs established in 1902